Jaba is a Georgian masculine name. People with the name include:

Jaba Bregvadze (born 1987), a Georgian rugby player
Jaba Dvali (born 1985), a Georgian footballer
Jaba Gelashvili (born 1993), a Georgian alpine skier
Jaba Jighauri (born 1992), a Georgian footballer 
Jaba Kankava (born 1986), a Georgian footballer
Jaba Lipartia (born 1987), a Georgian footballer
Jaba Mujiri (born 1980), a Georgian footballer
Jaba Ioseliani (1926–2003), a Georgian politician and paramilitary leader

See also
Jaba (disambiguation)
Jabá, (Silvino João de Carvalho, born 1981), a Brazilian footballer

Georgian masculine given names